Viracachá is a town and municipality in the Márquez Province, Colombia, part of the Colombian department of Boyacá. Other parts of Viracachá reach . The municipality borders Siachoque, Rondón and Soracá in the north and east, in the south Ciénega and Ciénega, Soracá and Ramiriquí in the west.

Etymology 
About the name Viracachá exist different interpretations. One interpretation says the name is derived from Quechua and means "air of the lake". Another attributes it to Chibcha meaning "lord of the enclosure of the wind".

History 
In the centuries before the Spanish conquest Viracachá was inhabited by the Muisca, organized in their loose Muisca Confederation. Due to its proximity to the northern capital Hunza, Viracachá was ruled by the zaque. Modern Viracachá was founded by Dominican missionaries on February 15, 1556.

Economy 
Viracachá is a rural village where most of the people work in the tertiary sector of services. Also agriculture and chicken farming is executed. The town does not have a bank.

References 

Municipalities of Boyacá Department
Populated places established in 1556
1556 establishments in the Spanish Empire
Muisca Confederation
Muysccubun